Nelly Power (10 April 1854 – 19 January 1887) was the stage name of Ellen Maria Lingham, an English singer, actress and popular performer in music hall, Victorian burlesque and pantomime. Her funeral attracted three to four thousand spectators at Abney Park Cemetery and a further great crowd at the start of the procession from her home.

Early life 
Power was born on 10 April 1854 in St Pancras, the youngest daughter of Arthur Lingham and Agnes Lingham (nee Power). Her father, a railway clerk, died less than a month before her birth. She had two older sisters who both died in childhood: Alice Sarah Adelaide (1850–1853) and Agnes (1852–1854). Power grew up with her mother, who reverted to the name Power, and a boarder, Thomas Sheppard James, who would become her mother's second husband in 1887.

Career
Power was a performer in music hall from the age of 8 when, as a pupil of Mrs J W Gordon, she appeared, singing two comic songs, at Gordon's Music Hall in Southampton. She continued to sing and also performed impersonations and developed a comic style mimicking that of George Leybourne, which brought her fame by the age of 15.

She made her first appearance on the legitimate London stage in 1868 in the pantomime version of Robinson Crusoe at the Surrey Theatre. She then moved to the Vaudeville Theatre performing as principal "boy" in a number of burlesque plays by Robert Reece and Henry J. Byron: Don Carlos, Elizabeth Camaralzaman, The Orange Tree and the Bumble Bee, The Very Last Days of Pompeii, and Romulus and Remus. This was followed by a further spell in pantomime at the Surrey Theatre and the Drury Lane Theatre where, in 1881, she had the title role in the pantomime Sindbad the Sailor, with Vesta Tilley as Captain Tralala. She achieved national fame in the music halls with an act in which she caricatured dandies with comic songs such as "La-di-la". She was the original singer of "The Boy I Love Is Up in the Gallery", which was written for her by songwriter/composer George Ware.

Power died from pleurisy in 1887, aged 32, and was buried at Abney Park Cemetery in London. A commemorative blue plaque was erected in 2017 at her former home, 97 Southgate Road, Islington, by the theatre charity The Music Hall Guild of Great Britain and America.

References

External links
Profile, FootlightNotes (includes picture and obituaries)

1854 births
1887 deaths
Burials at Abney Park Cemetery
19th-century British women singers
Music hall performers
Singers from London
Vaudeville performers